Oradour-sur-Vayres is a commune in the Haute-Vienne department in the Nouvelle-Aquitaine region in west-central France.

History

Oradour-sur-Glane massacre 
The Oradour-sur-Glane massacre occurred based on erroneous intelligence indicating that villagers were holding a German SS officer, who was being held in Oradour-sur-Vayres.

Gallery

See also
Communes of the Haute-Vienne department

References

External links 

 Oradour-sur-Vayres Official Website

Communes of Haute-Vienne